Oleksandr Sklyar (born February 26, 1991, in Kharkiv, Ukrainian SSR) is a Ukrainian professional footballer who plays as a midfielder for FC Vorskla Poltava in the Ukrainian Premier League.

Career 
Sklyar is the product of the Youth Sportive School #13 and UFK Kharkiv's Youth Systems, and his first trainer was Valeriy Ryzhykh.

Sklyar's professional career continue, when he was promoted to Kharkiv's reserves during the 2008-09 season. And in 2009 he made his debut for the Ukrainian Premier League.

References

External links 
 
 

Ukrainian footballers
FC Kharkiv players
FC Zirka Kropyvnytskyi players
FC Vorskla Poltava players
Ukrainian Premier League players
Ukrainian First League players
Association football midfielders
1991 births
Living people
Footballers from Kharkiv